Ardeshir Kamkar (born 1962 in Sanandaj, Iran) is a Kurdish musician from Iran.

He started his music training under the supervision of his father. He came to Tehran in 1980 and continued studying traditional arrangements under Mohammad Reza Lotfi and his brother Pashang. Ardeshir has always been keen to explore the range and capabilities of the kamancheh, for which he has written a number of pieces and books.

Kamkar has played with several famous ensembles such as, Dastan, Aref and Sheyda. In the album of Dastan (1364 Iranian calendar) he accompanied the improvisation of M. R. Shajarian. He has recently worked with the talented vocalist, Homayoun Shajarian.

He has also international collaboration. One well received album of which is titled "From Pontos to Persia" (Greek Άπο τον Πόντο στην Περσία) which according to some sources "is a unique CD which combines the music of Pontos and that of Persia. Matthaios Tsahouridis  plays  the Pontic Lyra accompanied by Ardeshir Kamkar on the Iranian Kamancheh and Hussein Zahawy on the daf. Songs include Pontic Lyra Improvisation, Union, Horizons, The Meeting, Solo Daf and Iranian Kamancheh Improvisation."

See also
Kamkar
The Kamkars
Kurdish music
Music of Iran
Demonstration with Mathaios Tsahouridis

1962 births
Living people
20th-century Iranian musicians
Iranian kamancheh players
Kurdish musicians
People from Sanandaj
Iranian Kurdish people

Barbad award winners
21st-century Iranian musicians